Utsjoki Church is a church in the Lapland town of Utsjoki. It is the northernmost church in Finland as well as in the European Union. The church was designed by the architecture office of Ernst Lohrmann and was built with grey stones during the years 1850–1853. The small church seats 230 people within its 170 square metres.

References

External links 

Lutheran churches in Finland
Ernst Lohrmann buildings